Thomas Anthony Bianco (born December 16, 1952) is a former Major League Baseball third baseman for the Milwaukee Brewers. He was born in Rockville Centre, New York. He was a switch hitter and threw right handed.

Bianco was drafted by the Milwaukee Brewers as the 3rd overall pick in the 1st round of the 1971 draft. Bianco made his major league debut on May 28, 1975. He played 18 career games in Major League Baseball. He had 6 hits in 34 at bats (a .176 batting average) and no home runs or RBIs.

He currently is a hitting instructor at Dave Lemanczyk's baseball academy in Long Island, NY.

Milwaukee Brewers players
1952 births
Living people
People from Rockville Centre, New York
Denver Bears players
Evansville Triplets players
Montgomery Rebels players
Newark Co-Pilots players
Rochester Red Wings players
Sacramento Solons players
San Antonio Brewers players
Spokane Indians players
Baseball players from New York (state)